Yar-Bazar is a rural locality (a selo) in Kamyshovsky Selsoviet, Limansky District, Astrakhan Oblast, Russia. The population was 256 as of 2010. There are 5 streets.

Geography 
Yar-Bazar is located 38 km northeast of Liman (the district's administrative centre) by road. Zorino is the nearest rural locality.

References 

Rural localities in Limansky District